Khieu Samphan (born 28 July 1931) is a Cambodian former communist politician and economist who was the chairman of the state presidium of Democratic Kampuchea (Cambodia) from 1976 until 1979. As such, he served as Cambodia's head of state and was one of the most powerful officials in the Khmer Rouge movement, although Pol Pot remained the General Secretary (highest official) in the party.

Prior to joining the Khmer Rouge, he was a member of Norodom Sihanouk's Sangkum government. After the 1967 leftist rebellion, Sihanouk ordered the arrest of leftists including Samphan, who fled into hiding until the Khmer Rouge takeover in 1975. On 7 August 2014, along with other members of the regime, he was convicted and received a life sentence for crimes against humanity during the Cambodian genocide, and a further trial found him guilty of genocide in 2018. He is the oldest living former prime minister and the last surviving senior member of the Khmer Rouge following the deaths of Nuon Chea in August 2019 and Kang Kek Iew in September 2020.

Biography
Samphan was born in Svay Rieng Province to Khieu Long, who served as a judge under the French Protectorate government and his wife Por Kong. Samphan was of Khmer-Chinese extraction, having inherited his Chinese heritage from his maternal grandfather. When Samphan was a young boy, Khieu Long was found guilty of corruption and sentenced to imprisonment, leaving Samphan's mother to take up a living selling fruits and vegetables in Kampong Cham Province where he grew up. Nevertheless, Samphan managed to earn a seat at the Lycée Sisowath and was able to travel to France to pursue his university studies in Economics at the University of Montpellier, after which he earned a PhD at the University of Paris.

Samphan became a member of the circle of leftist Khmer intellectuals studying at the Sorbonne, Paris, in the 1950s. His 1959 doctoral thesis Cambodia's Economy and Industrial Development advocated national self-reliance and generally sided with dependency theorists in blaming the wealthy, industrialized states for the poverty of the Third World. He was one of the founders of the Khmer Students' Association (KSA), out of which grew the left-wing revolutionary movements that would so alter Cambodian history in the 1970s, most notably the Khmer Rouge. Once the KSA was shuttered by French authorities in 1956, he founded yet another student organization, the Khmer Students' Union.

Returning from Paris with his doctorate in 1959, Samphan held a law faculty position at the University of Phnom Penh and started L'Observateur, a French-language leftist publication that was viewed with hostility by the government. L'Observateur was banned by the government in the following year and police publicly humiliated Samphan by beating, undressing and photographing him in public. Despite this, Samphan was invited to join Prince Norodom Sihanouk's Sangkum, a 'national movement' that operated as the single political party within Cambodia. Samphan stood as a Sangkum deputy in the 1962, 1964 and 1966 elections, in which the lattermost the rightist elements of the party, led by Lon Nol, gained an overwhelming victory. During his tenure, according to Minister of Information Trinh Hoanh, he was known as "a modest man of relatively humble origins who, even while minister of economy, refused to be driven in a Government limousine". In 1966, he then became a member of a 'Counter-Government' created by Sihanouk to keep the rightists under control. However, Samphan's radicalism led to a split in the party and he had to flee to a jungle after an arrest warrant was issued against him. At the time, he was even rumoured to have been murdered by Sihanouk's security forces.

In the Cambodian coup of 1970, the National Assembly voted to remove Prince Sihanouk as head of state, and the Khmer Republic was proclaimed later that year. The Khmer Rouge, including Samphan, joined forces with the now-deposed Prince Sihanouk in establishing an anti-Khmer Republic coalition known as the National United Front of Kampuchea (FUNK), and an associated government: the Royal Government of the National Union of Kampuchea (GRUNK). In this alliance with his former enemies, Samphan served as deputy prime minister, minister of defence, and commander-in-chief of the Cambodian People's National Liberation Armed Forces, the GRUNK military. FUNK defeated the Khmer Republic in April 1975 and took control of all of Kampuchea.

During the years of Communist Democratic Kampuchea (1975–1979), Samphan remained near the top of the movement, assuming the post of president of the central presidium in 1976. His faithfulness to Pol Pot meant that he survived the purges in the later years of the Khmer Rouge rule. His roles within the party suggest he was well entrenched in the upper echelons of the Communist Party of Kampuchea, and a leading figure in the ruling elite.

In 1985, he officially succeeded Pol Pot as leader of the Khmer Rouge, and served in this position until 1998. In December 1998, Samphan and former Pol Pot deputy Nuon Chea surrendered to the Royal Cambodian Government. Prime Minister Hun Sen, however, defied international pressure and Samphan was not arrested or prosecuted at the time of his surrender.

Arrest and trial

On 13 November 2007, the 76-year-old Samphan reportedly suffered a stroke. This occurred one day after the former Khmer Rouge Deputy Prime Minister and Foreign Minister Ieng Sary and his wife were arrested for war crimes committed while they were in power. At about the same time, a book by Samphan, Reflection on Cambodian History Up to the Era of Democratic Kampuchea, was published; in the book, he wrote that he had worked for social justice and the defence of national sovereignty, while attributing responsibility for all of the group's policies to Pol Pot.

According to Samphan, under the Khmer Rouge, "there was no policy of starving people. Nor was there any direction set out for carrying out mass killings", and "there was always close consideration of the people's well-being". He acknowledged the use of coercion to produce food due to shortages. Samphan also strongly criticized the current government in the book, blaming it for corruption and social ills.

Historian Ben Kiernan stated that Samphan's protestations (such as he regarded the collectivization of agriculture as a surprise, and his expressions of sympathy for Hu Nim, a fellow member of the CPK hierarchy tortured and killed at Tuol Sleng) betrayed the fundamental "moral cowardice" of a man mesmerized by power but lacking any nerve.

After he left a Phnom Penh hospital where he was treated following his stroke, Samphan was arrested by the Cambodia Tribunal and charged with crimes against humanity and war crimes.

In April 2008, Samphan made his first appearance at Cambodia's genocide tribunal. His lawyers, Jacques Vergès and Say Bory, used the defence that while Samphan has never denied that many people in Cambodia were killed, as head of state, he was never directly responsible for any crimes. On 7 August 2014, he and Nuon Chea received life sentences for crimes against humanity. His lawyer immediately announced the conviction would be appealed. The tribunal continued with a trial on his genocide charges as a separate process. The tribunal found him guilty on 16 November 2018 of the crime of genocide against the Vietnamese people, but he was cleared of involvement in the genocidal extermination of the Chams.  The judgment also emphasised that Samphan "encouraged, incited and legitimised" the criminal policies that led to the deaths of civilians "on a massive scale" including the millions forced into labour camps to build dams and bridges and the mass extermination of Vietnamese.

On 16 August 2021, Samphan appeared before a court in Phnom Penh to appeal against his conviction, in an attempt to overturn it. The appeal was rejected on 22 September 2022, with the guilty verdicts of genocide, crimes against humanity, and grave breaches of the Geneva Convention confirmed.

Notes

References
 Barron, John and Paul, Anthony; Murder of a gentle land: the untold story of a Communist genocide in Cambodia, Reader's Digest Press, 1977, 
 Esterline, John H. and Mae H., "How the dominoes fell": Southeast Asia in perspective, University Press of America, 1990,

External links

 Cambodia Tribunal Monitor

|-

|-

|-

|-

|-

1931 births
20th-century Cambodian politicians
Academic staff of Royal University of Phnom Penh
Cambodian expatriates in France
Cambodian Buddhists
Cambodian communists
Cambodian revolutionaries
Cambodian socialists
Khmer Rouge party members
Cambodian people convicted of crimes against humanity
Cambodian politicians of Chinese descent
Cambodian politicians convicted of crimes
Cambodian prisoners sentenced to life imprisonment
Communist Party of Kampuchea politicians
Genocide perpetrators
Foreign ministers of Cambodia
Government ministers of Cambodia
Heads of state of Cambodia
Leaders of political parties
Living people
People convicted by the Khmer Rouge Tribunal
People convicted of genocide
People from Svay Rieng province
Prime Ministers of Cambodia
Prisoners sentenced to life imprisonment by Cambodia
Sangkum politicians
University of Montpellier alumni
University of Paris alumni
Heads of government who were later imprisoned